Apocydia is a genus of moths of the family Tortricidae.

Species
Apocydia pervicax (Meyrick, 1911)

See also
List of Tortricidae genera

References

External links
tortricidae.com

Grapholitini
Monotypic moth genera
Taxa named by Marianne Horak
Tortricidae genera